Qojiabad (also Romanized as Qojīābād) is a village in Mokriyan-e Gharbi Rural District, in the Central District of Mahabad County, West Azerbaijan Province, Iran. At the 2006 census, its population was 305, in 56 families.

References 

Populated places in Mahabad County